The Fibbia is a  high mountain in the Swiss Lepontine Alps; the Fibbia overlooks the Gotthard Pass, in the canton of Ticino.

References

External links
 Fibbia on Hikr

Mountains of the Alps
Mountains of Switzerland
Mountains of Ticino
Lepontine Alps